John Jacob Hallum Jr. (November 2, 1938 – August 6, 2015) was an American football coach and scout. He served as the head football coach at Morehead State University in Morehead, Kentucky from 1968 to 1971, compiling a record of 22–17–1. After leaving Morehead State, he was an offensive line assistant under Jerry Claiborne at the University of Maryland and University of Kentucky. Following his retirement from coaching, Hallum served as a scout for New England Patriots and Cleveland Browns of the National Football League (NFL).

Head coaching record

College

References

External links
 

1938 births
2015 deaths
Cleveland Browns scouts
Kentucky Wildcats football coaches
Maryland Terrapins football coaches
Morehead State Eagles football coaches
New England Patriots scouts
High school football coaches in Kentucky